David Dana "Dave" Clark (born April 7, 1944) is an American computer scientist and Internet pioneer who has been involved with Internet developments since the mid-1970s. He currently works as a Senior Research Scientist at MIT's Computer Science and Artificial Intelligence Laboratory (CSAIL).

Education
He graduated from Swarthmore College in 1966. In 1968, he received his Master's and Engineer's degrees in Electrical Engineering from MIT, where he worked on the I/O architecture of Multics under Jerry Saltzer.  He received his Ph.D. in Electrical Engineering from MIT in 1973.

Career
From 1981 to 1989, he acted as chief protocol architect in the development of the Internet, and chaired the Internet Activities Board, which later became the Internet Architecture Board. He has also served as chairman of the Computer Sciences and Telecommunications Board of the National Research Council. 

In 1990 he was awarded the SIGCOMM Award in recognition of his major contributions to Internet protocol and architecture. Clark received in 1998 the IEEE Richard W. Hamming Medal. 

In 1996, Clark was elected a member of the National Academy of Engineering for the design and development of efficient implementation techniques for Internet protocols. In 2001, he was inducted as a Fellow of the Association for Computing Machinery. 

Also in 2001, he was awarded the Telluride Tech Festival Award of Technology in Telluride, Colorado, and in 2011 the Internet & Society Lifetime Achievement Award from the Oxford Internet Institute at the Oxford University.

His recent research interests include what the architecture of the Internet will look like in the post-PC era as well as "extensions to the Internet to support real-time traffic, explicit allocation of service, pricing and related economic issues, and policy issues surrounding local loop employment".

Legacy

Clark has been credited with a popular statement in the computer science realm: 

In 1999, law professor Lawrence Lessig stated that "rough consensus and running code" had broad significance as "a manifesto that will define our generation.' Clark's new ethos of consensus has become a widely used methodology software development today and replaced a more top down approach that existed in the 80s.

Selected publications
 David D. Clark, "An Input/Output Architecture for Virtual Memory Computer Systems", Ph.D. dissertation, Project MAC Technical Report 117, January 1974
 L. W. McKnight, W. Lehr, David D. Clark (eds.), Internet Telephony, MIT Press, 2001, 
 David D. Clark, "The Design Philosophy of the DARPA Internet Protocols", Computer Communications Review 18:4, August 1988, pp. 106–114
 R. Braden, David D. Clark, S. Shenker, and J. Wroclawski, "Developing a Next-Generation Internet Architecture", ISI white paper, 2000
 David D. Clark, K. Sollins, J. Wroclawski, R. Braden, "Tussle in Cyberspace: Defining Tomorrow’s Internet", Proceedings of SIGCOMM 2002, ACM Press, 2002
 David D. Clark, K. Sollins, J. Wroclawski, and T. Faber, "Addressing Reality: An Architectural Response to Real-World Demands on the Evolving Internet", ACM SIGCOMM 2003 Workshops, Karlsruhe, August 2003

Notes

External links

 David D. Clark's official biography
 List of online papers of David D. Clark
 MIT homepage of David D. Clark featuring publication list, working papers, biography, etc.
 

American computer scientists
Internet pioneers
Living people
1944 births
Fellows of the Association for Computing Machinery
Swarthmore College alumni
Members of the United States National Academy of Engineering
MIT School of Engineering alumni
Multics people
Massachusetts Institute of Technology faculty